Highland Lawn Cemetery is a city-owned rural cemetery in Terre Haute, Indiana. Opened in 1884, the cemetery includes .

The cemetery features a Richardsonian Romanesque chapel built by architect Jesse A. Vrydaugh in 1893 for a cost of $10,000. In the 1980s, the chapel underwent renovation which was completed in March 1988. Highland Lawn also includes a bell tower built by the Heidenreich Company in 1894, a gateway arch completed by Edward Hazledine and a Colonial rest house designed by W.H. Floyd.

Highland Lawn was placed on the National Register of Historic Places in 1990 for its significance in agriculture and landscaping.

Folklore
The cemetery is known in local folklore including the story of Stiffy Green, a taxidermied dog buried in his owner's tomb who was said to bark periodically, and of Martin Sheets, who was convinced he would be buried alive and thus installed a telephone inside of his tomb with a direct line to the cemetery's main office.

Notable burials
 Ellen Church (1904–1965), aviation innovator and nurse
 Eugene Debs (1855–1926), socialist and politician
 Theodore Debs (1864–1945), Eugene's brother and socialist political activist
 Max Ehrmann (1872–1945), writer, poet, and attorney
 Courtland Gillen (1880–1954), U.S. Representative
 Eva Mozes Kor (1934–2019), Holocaust survivor and activist
 Juliet Peddle (1899–1979), architect
 Allen Pence (1819–1908), pharmacist and pioneer of spiritualism
 Everett Sanders (1882–1950), politician and republican
 D. Omer Seamon (1911–1997), painter
 Valeska Suratt (1882–1962), silent film and stage actress
 Bud Taylor (1903–1962), boxer

References

External links
 

Historic districts on the National Register of Historic Places in Indiana
Cemeteries on the National Register of Historic Places in Indiana
1884 establishments in Indiana
Richardsonian Romanesque architecture in Indiana
Protected areas of Vigo County, Indiana
Tourist attractions in Terre Haute, Indiana
Historic districts in Terre Haute, Indiana
National Register of Historic Places in Terre Haute, Indiana
Rural cemeteries